Ştefan Kroner (born 30 May 1939) is a Romanian water polo player. He competed at the 1960 Summer Olympics and the 1964 Summer Olympics.

References

1939 births
Living people
Romanian male water polo players
Olympic water polo players of Romania
Water polo players at the 1960 Summer Olympics
Water polo players at the 1964 Summer Olympics
People from Sighișoara